John Key (born 1961) was the 38th Prime Minister of New Zealand, 2008–2016.

John Key may also refer to:
Sir John Key, 1st Baronet (1794–1858), Lord Mayor of London 1830–1832, MP for City of London 1832–1833
John A. Key (1871–1954), American politician
John Ross Key (1754–1821), American lawyer and judge
John Ross Key (artist) (1832–1920), American frontier landscapes artist
John Maurice Key (1905–1984), Bishop of Sherborne then Truro

See also
John Keys (disambiguation)
Johnny Key (disambiguation)
John Keay (born 1941), English journalist and writer